Gerardo Vera (born 7 March 1955) is a Venezuelan former swimmer. He competed in three events at the 1972 Summer Olympics.

References

1955 births
Living people
Venezuelan male swimmers
Olympic swimmers of Venezuela
Swimmers at the 1972 Summer Olympics
Place of birth missing (living people)
20th-century Venezuelan people